Eelgrass is a common name for several plants and may refer to:
 Zostera, marine eelgrass
 Vallisneria, freshwater eelgrass